Oleg Borisovich Chen (born 22 November 1988) is a Russian weightlifter. He is a two-time European Champion.

His father was Korean and his mother was half Hungarian half Russian. When he was 11 his family moved to Novosibirsk; Chen now resides in Anapa.

References

1988 births
Living people
Russian male weightlifters
World Weightlifting Championships medalists
Russian people of Korean descent
Russian people of Hungarian descent
European Weightlifting Championships medalists
20th-century Russian people
21st-century Russian people